The European Centre for Development Policy Management, more commonly known as ECDPM, is a think tank founded in 1986. It is headquartered in Maastricht, Netherlands and has a second office in Brussels, Belgium.

ECDPM researches Europe-Africa relations, aiming “to promote innovative forms of international cooperation involving European and African actors to address major global development challenges".

Aims and objectives

ECDPM's mission is to "make policies in Europe and Africa work for inclusive and sustainable development."

Thematic workstreams

ECDPM organises its work under 3 main thematic clusters and within each cluster, there are 10 workstreams:

Europe and Africa in the world

 EU foreign and development policy
 Migration and mobility
 Digital economy and governance
 AU-EU relations

Peaceful societies and accountable governance

 Peace, security and resilience
 Democratic governance and accountability
 Economic recovery and transformation
 Climate change and green transition

Sustainable African economies and climate action

 African economic integration
 Sustainable food systems

Funding

ECDPM receives strategic and financial support from the governments of several countries, notably the Netherlands, Belgium, Austria, Ireland, Denmark, Estonia, Finland, Sweden and Luxembourg. Other institutions and organisations also. provide ECDPM with funding on a project basis.

Partnerships

ECDPM collaborates with several think tanks, governments and other institutions to create webinar series, interviews series  and papers and commentaries.

ECDPM is part of the ETTG (European Think Tank Group) network. Other think tanks in this network are ODI, Elcano Royal Institute, Istituto Affari Internazionali, the German Development Institute and IDDRI.

References

Sources
 preval.org
 lencd.com
 www.s2bnetwork.org
 www.fes.de
 www.inwent.org

External links
 ECDPM website
 Capacity.org
 ACP-EU trade website
 GREAT Insights – ECDPM's monthly magazine on economic development in Africa and the developing world. It gathers expert analysis and commentary from a number of perspectives.
 Weekly Compass Update – is a weekly electronic newsletter which focuses on the EU and its relations with countries in Africa, the Caribbean and the Pacific.

Organizations related to the European Union
Think tanks established in 1986
Think tanks based in the Netherlands
Organisations based in Limburg (Netherlands)
Maastricht